The Stockholm municipal election of 1976 was held on 19 September 1976 concurrently with the 1976 Swedish parliamentary election.  This election used a party-list proportional representation system to allocate the 101 seats of the Stockholm city council (Stockholms stadsfullmäktige) amongst the various Swedish political parties.  Voter turnout was 88.1%.

Results

See also
 Elections in Sweden
 List of political parties in Sweden
 City of Stockholm

References
Statistics Sweden, "Kommunfullmäktigval - valresultat" (Swedish) 
Statistics Sweden, "Kommunfullmäktigval - erhållna mandat efter kommun och parti. Valår 1973–2006" (Swedish) 

Municipal elections in Stockholm
1976 elections in Sweden
1970s in Stockholm
September 1976 events in Europe